Arrasmith is a surname. Notable people with the surname include:

 William Strudwick Arrasmith (1898–1965), American architect
 Anne Arrasmith (1946–2017), American artist 
 Joseph W. Arrasmith (1845–1918), American politician